The 1994–95 Illinois Fighting Illini men's basketball team represented the University of Illinois.

Regular season

Roster

Source

Schedule
												
Source																
												

|-
!colspan=12 style="background:#DF4E38; color:white;"| Non-Conference regular season

	

|-
!colspan=9 style="background:#DF4E38; color:#FFFFFF;"|Big Ten regular season

|-
!colspan=9 style="text-align: center; background:#DF4E38"|NCAA tournament

|-

Player stats

Awards and honors
 Kiwane Garris
Team Most Valuable Player

Team players drafted into the NBA

Rankings

References

Illinois
Illinois Fighting Illini men's basketball seasons
Illinois
1994 in sports in Illinois
1995 in sports in Illinois